Nantyr Shores Secondary School is a public secondary school (grades 9–12) located in the community of Alcona in the Town of Innisfil, Ontario, Canada. It is part of the Simcoe County District School Board and has an enrollment of about 1100 students  (December 2020). The principal of the school is Mark Keating.

The superintendent of the school is Lisa Coffey. (Area 3b schools- South Barrie & Innisfil).

History
Nantyr Shores Secondary School in Alcona opened in 2001  as the only three-storey school in Simcoe County.

Ranking

The Fraser Institute Report Card on Secondary Schools gives Nantyr Shores the following ranking:

The Tritons
Nantyr Shores has a Triton as their mascot, nicknamed Regan. It was named this after a former vice-principal at Nantyr died of cancer. The mascot is represented as an aqua-type man with blonde hair and bare chest, as well as gold and teal pants. The mascot was purchased by the 2005-2006 Nantyr Shores Student Council.

Extracurricular activities

Clubs:

Link Crew
Ski & Board Club
Improv
Chess Club
Global Action
Rowing Club
A.V. Club
E.C.O.S
Prom Committee
Dance Team
GSA Club
Announcements
E.C.O.S.
Book Club
Band
K-9 Club
Model U.N.
Mock Trial
Gamer's Guild
Leadership
Relay for Life

Sports programs:

Baseball
Basketball
Cross country
Curling
Flag football and Football
Golf
Hockey
Rugby
Soccer
Swimming
Track and field
Volleyball
Wrestling

Events and projects

Spin 4 Kids
Spin 4 Kids was an annual event that took place at Nantyr Shores. This event is to raise money not only for Nantyr's sports teams and clubs but the Royal Victorian Hospitals Cancer Care Center. Spin 4 Kids consisted of over 50 riders at a time pedalling on exercise bikes for 12 hours, live entertainment, a Hallway of Achievement, silent auction, and plenty of refreshments. This event is put together mostly by students. From 2005 to 2008 the event raised over $18,000 for the RVH Cancer Care Centre, and approximately $68,000 for Nantyr's sports teams and clubs. The event is no longer run.

Green Tie Gala Project
The Gala Project was an initiative set up by the ECOS Club and Challenge and Change class at Nantyr Shores to fund the future project of the placement of solar panels on top of the school's roof. The event was to help raise funds for the project and is supported by the community, local business, as well as the staff and students at Nantyr Shores.

The third annual Green Tie Gala that took place in 2012 earned approximately $3500.

Since, Nantyr Shores Secondary School has raised the $30,000 required and now has an array of solar panels on its roof.

In the news 
Nantyr Shores Secondary School has been talked about on national TV on two separate occasions.

The first taking place in 2013, after YouTube Video "Hallway Swimming" went viral, afterwards making appearances on talk shows such as The Ellen DeGeneres Show.

The second event took place in June 2017, when Nantyr became one of the first High Schools in North America to have a transgender prom king. Nantyr Student RJ Smith, won the title of Prom King after a joke by their friend took off.

See also
List of high schools in Ontario

References

External links
Nantyr Shores Secondary School

High schools in Simcoe County
Educational institutions established in 2000
2000 establishments in Ontario